The Café de la Régence in Paris was an important European centre of chess in the 18th and 19th centuries. All important chess masters of the time played there.

The Café's masters included, but are not limited to:
 Paul Morphy
 François-André Danican Philidor (who often met with Benjamin Franklin)
 Legall de Kermeur (Philidor's teacher)
 Jules Arnous de Rivière
 Adolf Anderssen
 Samuel Rosenthal
 Pierre Charles Fournier de Saint-Amant
 Lionel Kieseritzky
 Louis-Charles Mahé de La Bourdonnais

Addresses
It was opened in 1681 as the Café de la Place du Palais-Royal, near the Palais-Royal, Paris. By the 18th century it was known as the Café de la Régence ("Regency Café").
 In 1852 the café moved temporarily to hôtel Dodun, 21 Rue de Richelieu.
 In 1854 the Café de la Régence moved to 161 Rue Saint-Honoré and remained there until it became a restaurant in 1910.
 The chess players moved to the café de l'Univers in 1916.
 The Office national marocain du tourisme (National Moroccan Tourist Office) took over the site in 1918.

Additional information

 The "great tournament of Paris 1867," won by Ignatz von Kolisch over Szymon Winawer and Wilhelm Steinitz, was played there.
 La Société des Amateurs was based there.
 In 1742, the celebrated French writers and philosophers Diderot and Rousseau met at this café.
Karl Marx met Friedrich Engels for the second time at this café on 28 August 1844.
 According to the painter , Jean Sibelius improvised the main theme, A Prayer to God, of the finale of his Third Symphony at Café de la Régence, in January 1906.
 The Norwegian painter Edvard Munch visited the café on 4 May 1885, during his first visit to France to study the French impressionists.

See also

References

Bibliography

External link

Chess places
History of chess
Chess in France
18th century in Paris
18th century in chess
19th century in Paris